The Scout and Guide movement in Honduras is served by:
 Asociación Nacional de Muchachas Guías de Honduras, member of the World Association of Girl Guides and Girl Scouts
 Association of Scouts in Honduras, member of the World Organization of the Scout Movement
 Asociación Hondureña de Escultismo Tradicional, member of the World Federation of Independent Scouts

International Scouting units in Honduras
In addition, there are American Boy Scouts in Tegucigalpa, linked to the Direct Service branch of the Boy Scouts of America, which supports units around the world, as well as Girl Scouts of the USA.

See also